The Danish Trade Union Confederation (FH) is the largest national trade union centre in Denmark.  On formation in 2019, it had 79 affiliated unions, with a total of 1.4 million members.

History
The confederation was founded on 1 January 2019, when the Danish Confederation of Trade Unions (LO) merged with the Confederation of Professionals in Denmark (FTF).  LO consisted of 18 unions, with a total of one million members, most of whom worked in the private sector, while FTF consisted of 70 professional organisations, with a total of just under 500,000 members, most of whom worked in the public sector.

LO and FTF began discussing a possible merger in 2015.  Some affiliates were dubious about the proposition.  The FTF's Finance Federation opposed the merger, while LO's largest affiliate, the United Federation of Danish Workers (3F), only decided to support it early in March 2018.  One week after 3F's decision, the FTF and LO voted on the proposal.  389 out of 400 delegates to the LO conference approved the merger, and 71.4% of voters in the FTF approved.  The new federation's name and leadership were agreed in October 2018.

Denmark's other trade union centre, the Danish Confederation of Professional Associations (AC), decided against joining the new federation, arguing that its members' interests differed from those of the members of the LO and FTF.

Policy
The new organisation decided to maintain the "Danish model", whereby pay and working conditions are negotiated without state involvement.  It also argued in support of the Danish welfare state.

The federation remained affiliated to the European Trade Union Confederation (ETUC), and argued that, as a larger organisation, it would be more influential within the ETUC.  The federation also affiliated to Joint Committee of the Nordic Social Democratic Labour Movement, but described itself as independent of any political party.

The federation organises May Day demonstrations.  For its first May Day, in 2019, the theme of the demonstrations was "unity".

Organisation
The federation is led by president Lizette Risgaard, former president of LO, and six vice presidents.

The unions affiliated to FH have a high degree of independence, leaving the headquarters relatively small and with limited funds.  FH was established with 25% fewer staff than its combined predecessors, and aimed to save 30% of administration costs.

Affiliates

References

National trade union centers of Denmark
Trade unions established in 2019